Danielea moelensis is a species of crab in the family Xanthidae, and the only species in the genus Danielea.

References

Xanthoidea
Monotypic arthropod genera